Holambi Kalan is a suburban area in the Narela Sub Division of the North West Delhi district of Delhi, India. The area has a railway station named Holambi Kalan (Station Code: HUK). Its distance from Delhi Junction railway station is 21 km and it is 22 km away from New Delhi railway station. Metro Vihar is a rehabilitated colony which is in Holambi Kalan. The population of Metro Vihar is 42,392 according to the 2011 Census of India.

Demographics 
Hindi is the local language of Holambi Kalan but the English, Urdu, Haryanvi and Punjabi languages are also spoken.

Metro Vihar is a large rehabilitated colony which is a part of Holambi Kalan, Narela of North West Delhi district, Delhi with total 8157 families residing. The Holambi Kalan along with Metro Vihar has population of 42,392 of which 22,933 are males while 19,459 are females as per Population Census 2011.

In Holambi Kalan population of children with age 0–6 is 6091 which makes up 14.37% of total population of area. Average Sex Ratio of Holambi Kalan village is 849 which is lower than Delhi state average of 868. Child Sex Ratio for the Holambi Kalan as per census is 903, higher than Delhi average of 871.

Holambi Kalan has lower literacy rate compared to Delhi. In 2011, the literacy rate of Holambi Kalan was 67.50% compared to 86.21% of Delhi. In Holambi Kalan Male literacy stands at 76.09% while female literacy rate was 57.27%.

Geography 
Holambi Kalan mostly plain area. The elevation of Holambi Kalan from sea level is 210m.

Pin Code Of Holambi Kalan Is 110082

References

North West Delhi district